Shabqadar (
) is a town in the Charsadda District of Khyber Pakhtunkhwa province in Pakistan.

Overview and history 
Shabqadar is a tehsil headquarter of Shabqadar Tehsil in Charsadda District. The famous attractions of Shabqadar are Shabqadar Bazaar and Shabqadar Fort. The fort is made of mud and stone. It is designed by Sikh architect Tota Ram in 1837. Currently it is under the control of Frontier Constabulary and has 1800 personnel of the force are trained here. Former UK prime minister Winston Churchill once stayed at this fort during his service and part of expedition in the North West Frontier of India.

Majority of the people living in Shabqadar are Pakistani but a sizeable population of Afghans also live here. Most are Muslims with small minority are Christians. Major language is Pashto.

Education 
Shabqadar Town is the home of many public and private educational institutes, including Government Degree College Shabqadar and Govt Girls Degree College Shabqadar. Notable private institutes include The Educators, SSA College system, Saddat Public High School Shabqadar, Shabqadar Students Academy (SSA), Frontier Students Academy (FSA),  Allied Schools, Iqra Schools, Peshawar Model, ICEL College Of Engineering and Literacy, Charsadda institute of technology (CIT), PIT, Islamic School System, Hira Public School, National College and Islamia Model School.

Main Tribes 
List of Shabqadar Tehsil union councils are listed below:

Population 
The population of Shabqadar, according to 2017 census, is 383,765. The population of Shabqadar, according to official census, over the years is shown in the table below.

Administration 
Shabqadar becomes tehsil in 1988. The tehsil is administratively subdivided into 12 Union Councils of which the headquarter is Shabqadar town. Under new local government rules, Shabqadar tehsil is divided into 29 village councils (VC) and 6 neighbourhood councils (NC).

Population 
The population of Shabqadar Tehsil, according to the 2017 census, is 383,765 while according to the 1998 census, it was 240,751.

Tehsil Union Councils 
List of Shabqadar Tehsil union councils are listed below:

National Assembly Seat 
The Tehsil is represented in the National Assembly by MNAs who represent the following constituencies:

Provincial Assembly Seat 
The Tehsil is represented in the Provincial Assembly by MPAs who represent the following constituencies:

See also 
 Charsadda Tehsil
 Shabqadar Tehsil
 Tangi Tehsil
 Charsadda
 Charsadda District

References

Populated places in Charsadda District, Pakistan
Charsadda District, Pakistan